The Gamecock is a 1974 Italian comedy film directed by Pasquale Festa Campanile. It is based on the comedy play Neurotandem (1968) by Silvano Ambrogi.

Plot

Cast 
 Sydne Rome as Elena
 Antonio Salines as Carlo Amatriciani
 Roberto Antonelli as Chimico
 Paolo Gozlino as Doctor 
 Toni Ucci as Friar
 Marisa Bartoli as Veronica
 Vincenzo Crocitti as Padrone di Elena

See also     
 List of Italian films of 1974

References

External links

1974 films
Italian comedy films
1974 comedy films
Films directed by Pasquale Festa Campanile
Films scored by Gianni Ferrio
1970s Italian films
1970s Italian-language films